Chudawa or Chudava is a village and railway station on Purna taluka of Parbhani district in Indian state of Maharashtra. It is 12 km away from Purna.

Demography
As per 2011 census, Chudawa has total 696 families residing. Village has population of 3,657 of which 1,853 were males while 1,804 were females.
Average Sex Ratio of village is 974 which is higher than Maharashtra state average of 929.
Literacy rate of village was 74% compared to 82.95% of Maharashtra. Male literacy rate was 85.5% while female literacy rate was 63%.
Schedule Caste (SC) constitutes 30% of total population while Schedule Tribe was 2.7%.

Railway station
Chudawa railway station, whose code is CRU, is a part of Indian Railways' South Central Railway zone. The station is served by 16 daily diesel trains and has two platforms.

Distances
Following table shows distance of Chudawa from some of major cities.

References

Administration in chudawa village.

SARPANCH ( VILLAGE HEAD ) - RANJANA SHRIDHAR DESAI

DEPUTY SARPANCH - SUBHASH PANDURANG DESAI

Villages in Parbhani district